Basti Abdullah Railway Station 
() is  located in the town of Basti-Abdullah, Rajanpur district, in the province of Punjab, Pakistan.

History 
The railway station was built In the 1980s by the Pakistani government and is named after Lal Masjid's founder, Maulana Abdullah Ghazi

See also
 List of railway stations in Pakistan
 Pakistan Railways

References

External links

Railway stations in Rajanpur District